Kudirat Motonmori Olatokunbo popularly known as Kudirat Kekere-Ekun CFR (born 7 May 1958) is a Nigerian jurist and controversial Justice of the Supreme Court of Nigeria.

Education
Kekere Ekun was born on 7 May 1958 in London, United Kingdom. In 1980, she received a bachelor's degree in Law from the University of Lagos and was admitted to the Nigeria Bar on 10 July 1981, having graduated from the Nigerian Law School before she proceeded to the London School of Economics where she received a master's degree in Law in November 1983.

Awards
In October 2022, a Nigerian national honour of Commander of the Order of the Federal Republic (CFR) was conferred on her by President Muhammadu Buhari.

Law career
Kudirat joined the Lagos State Judiciary as Senior Magistrate II and rose to the position of the State High Court Judge. She served as Chairman of Robbery and Firearms Tribunal, Zone II, Ikeja between November 1996 to May 1999. She was appointed to the bench of the Nigerian courts of appeal in 2004 before her appointment as Justice of the Supreme Court of Nigeria in July 2013.

Controversies 
Kekere-Ekun in January 15, 2020, was the supreme court justice who led the seven-member panel  that sacked Sacked Imo State governor, Emeka Ihedioha and declared Hope Uzodinma of the All Progressives Congress (APC), a candidate who originally came fourth of candidates who contested the election as the winner of the March 9 governorship election in the state. The verdict was widely criticized as a flawed judgement coming from Nigeria's highest court of justice.

References

Nigerian women jurists
Living people
1948 births
University of Lagos alumni
People from Lagos State
Alumni of the London School of Economics
Lawyers from Lagos
Supreme Court of Nigeria justices